Dumbarton Burgh and County Tramways provided a tramway service in Dumbarton from 1907 to 1928.

History

The Dumbarton Burgh and Country Tramway were constructed by Dick, Kerr & Co. After initially being operated by the Electric Supply Corporation, it was transferred to the Dumbarton Burgh and County Tramways Company.

It ran from Dalmuir West through Dumbarton to Balloch, with a branch to Barloan Toll, and a branch to Jamestown.

Despite the connection with Glasgow Corporation Tramways at Dalmuir West, through running was not agreed.

Closure

The last tramway service ran on 3 March 1928, and two tramcars were transferred to Ayr Corporation Tramways.

References

Tram transport in Scotland
4 ft 7¾ in gauge railways in Scotland